Kertezi is a mountain village in the municipality of Kalavryta, Achaea, Greece. It is built in the valley of a tributary of the river Vouraikos, east of the mountain Kallifoni. In 2011 the population of Kertezi was 365. It is 12 km southwest of Kalavryta. During the Greek War of Independence, Anagnostis Striftombolas came to Kertezi, took a military body of 15 men and battled in the Battle of Levidi, where he was killed on 14 April 1821.

Population

See also

List of settlements in Achaea

External links
Kertezi at the GTP Travel Pages

References

Kalavryta
Populated places in Achaea